Engelbert Valentin Niedermeyer was an SS operative with the position of block leader in the Dachau concentration camp. After being tried and convicted in a court of law, and with special consideration given to his treatment of the inmates, on December 13, 1945 he was sentenced to die by hanging. Following due process, the sentence was carried out on May 28, 1946 in Landsberg.
The execution was filmed by U.S. military personnel, who recorded Niedermeyer's hanging, along with a coffin marked "Niedermeyer Engelbert."

References

1911 births
1946 deaths
SS personnel
Dachau trials executions